The 2004 Euro Beach Soccer League, was the seventh edition of the Euro Beach Soccer League (EBSL), originally known as the European Pro Beach Soccer League, the premier beach soccer competition contested between European men's national teams, occurring annually since its establishment in 1998. The league was organised by Beach Soccer Worldwide (BSWW) between July 2 and September 5, 2004 in ten different nations across Europe.

This season, BSWW introduced a third division, Division C, to the EBSL alongside the already existing Divisions A and B. Each team continued, as in the previous seasons, to compete in their respective division, including the newly added Division C nations, to try and earn a place in the season-finale event, the Superfinal, in which the league title was then contested directly.

Spain, who entered as defending champions, had looked odds on favourites to reclaim their title after dominating the top Division but suffered a shock loss to the Division C qualifiers and debutants, Ukraine, in the first round of the Superfinal. This opened the door for France, who had originally narrowly qualified for the season-finale, to ultimately be crowned champions, winning their first and to date only European title.

The league also doubled as the qualification process for the first FIFA Beach Soccer World Cup in 2005. The nations finishing in first, second and third place qualified directly whilst the teams in fourth through seventh place competed in a final play off stage to decide which nation would gain the remaining berth at the World Cup.

Teams
This season 18 nations took part in the Euro Beach Soccer League whom were and were distributed as follows:

Division A (6)

Division B (5)

Division C (7)

 (withdrew)

Superfinal berths
There were eight berths available in this season's Superfinal, expanded from the six spots in previous seasons. The table summarises in what positions nations needed to finish in their respective divisions in order to qualify to the Superfinal, what round of the Superfinal they would enter finishing in said positions, and the seeding they would receive.

Allocations

Division A, consisting of the best teams of the EBSL, was awarded four Superfinal berths
Division B, as the middle tier, received three berths
The new Division C, in consideration of being the bottom tier of teams, received just one berth.

Division A
Division A consisted of six rounds of fixtures known as stages, with one stage hosted in each of the six countries participating as shown. Four teams took part in each, with each team taking part in a total of four of the six stages. In each stage, the teams played each other once. The nation who earned the most points at the end of the stage was crowned stage winners.

At the end of the six stages all results were tallied up in a final league table.

Stage 1
The first stage took place in Marsielle, France. Portugal claimed the stage.

Matches

Final standings

Stage 2
The second stage took place in Scoglitti, Italy. Spain won their first stage of the season.

Matches

Final standings

Stage 3
The third stage took place in Portimão, Portugal. The hosts earned their second stage crown.

Matches

Final standings

Stage 4
The fourth stage took place in Stavanger, Norway. A second stage victory was claimed by Spain.

Matches

Final standings

Stage 5
The penultimate fifth stage took place in Palma de Mallorca, Mallorca, Spain. The hosts won their third stage title of the season. The Spanish also earned enough points during this stage to secure first place in the final division standings.

Matches

Final standings

Stage 6
The sixth and final stage was due to be the English stage of Division A, to be held in Brighton (originally to be stage 1 of the division, held at the end of June). However, the sponsors of the English event in previous years, Kronenbourg, and other potential sponsors, were deterred from investing in the event again due to this year's fixtures clashing with Euro 2004, in which it was believed audiences would be far more interested and therefore a risk to invest money into this event. Sky continued to offer TV coverage, but no new sponsor could be found, and so the stage was ultimately cancelled.

BSWW subsequently made an attempt to reorganise the stage as stage 6 in Catanzaro, Italy at the end of August, but this ultimately fell through too.

Final table
The top four teams qualified to the Superfinal. The final positions of the nations occupying first through fourth respectively determined seedings in the quarter-finals. Spain were crowned runaway winners of the division, earning the top seed in the Superfinal. France, finishing in the last qualifying position, claimed the lowest seed on offer in Division A.

Despite the teams playing different numbers of games due to stage 6 being cancelled, this ultimately proved inconsequential to the final league table since, after the completion of stage 5, Norway had no fixtures remaining and it was impossible for England to gain enough points in the final round of matches to move up into a Superfinal qualification spot. Hence the four qualifiers were confirmed at this point. If played, the matches of stage 6 would have been dead rubbers.

Division B
Like the top tier, Division B consisted of five rounds of fixtures known as stages, with one stage hosted in each of the five countries participating as shown. Four teams took part in each stage, with each nation participating in four of the five stages overall. In every round of fixtures the teams played each other once. The nation who earned the most points at the end of the stage was crowned stage winners.

At the end of the five stages all results were tallied up in a final league table.

Stage 1
The first stage took place in Istanbul, Turkey. Belgium won the first stage of Division B.

Matches

Final standings

Stage 2
The second stage took place in Linz, Austria. Switzerland won the event.

Matches

Final standings

Stage 3
The third stage took place in Palma de Mallorca, Spain, alongside the running of the Division A and C events. Austria claimed their first stage win.

Matches

Final standings

Stage 4
The fourth and next to last stage took place in Interlaken, Switzerland. The hosts won their second stage crown.

Matches

Final standings

Stage 5
The fifth and final stage took place in Brussels, Belgium. The hosts won the event, their second of the season, and secured the division title after beating Germany on the final day.

Matches

Final standings

Final table
The top three teams qualified to the Superfinal. The final positions of the nations occupying first through third respectively determined seedings in the quarter-finals. The remaining Division B nations exited this season's EBSL.

Belgium were crowned winners. Switzerland and Austria were the other two successful teams, the latter qualifying ahead of Germany by a slim margin.

Division C

Results

The inaugural season of Division C was played as a straight knockout tournament. All teams contesting the division started in the quarter-finals, playing one match per round until the final when the winner was crowned. The losers of the quarter-finals played in consolation matches to determine their final division placements.

Slovenia withdrew immediately prior to the start of the event, giving Poland a walkover into the semi-finals, Monaco a bye in the consolation matches with no opponent to face, and meant there was no seventh place play-off.

Final standings
The winner of the division qualified into the Superfinal quarter-finals. The remaining Division C nations exited this season's EBSL.

The Ukraine won the Division C tournament title, comfortably beating Hungary in the final. Since they withdrew, Slovenia did not receive a placing.

Superfinal

Qualified teams
This is a summary of the teams who qualified for the Superfinal.

Results

This season the Superfinal was played as a straight knockout tournament. All eight teams contesting the title started in the quarter-finals, playing one match per round until the final when the winner of the 2004 Euro Beach Soccer League was crowned. The losers of the quarter-finals played in consolation matches to determine their final league placements.

Championship match details

Winners

Superfinal final standings
France beat Portugal in the final to win their first Euro Beach Soccer League title.

The success of the three nations finishing in the podium positions meant they earned qualification for the upcoming FIFA Beach Soccer World Cup. The teams in fourth through seventh place competed in a final play off stage to decide which nation would gain the remaining berth at the World Cup.

Sources

 Roonba
 BSWW archive
 RSSSF

Euro Beach Soccer League
2004 in beach soccer